David La Haye (born April 19, 1966) is a Canadian actor.

Career 
He began his career in films in Yves Simoneau's Dans le ventre du dragon opposite such veteran stars as Rémy Girard and Pierre Curzi. With piercing eyes and an intense physical style, La Haye emerged in the 1990s as one of the most versatile actors on the Quebec scene, winning a Genie Award for best actor in L’Enfant d’eau playing a mentally handicapped victim of a shipwreck in the South Sea Islands. He was also nominated for his deft comic turn as troubled photographer incapable of making a commitment in Soft Shell Man.

Selected filmography 

1989: In the Belly of the Dragon (Dans le ventre du dragon) .... Lou
1991: Nelligan .... Arthur de Bussières
1992: Montréal P.Q. (TV Series) .... Edmond Brisebois
1992: La Bête de foire .... Grégoire
1992: La Fenêtre .... Young Italian man
1993: Blanche (TV Series) .... Napoléon Frigon
1993: Les Amoureuses .... Bernard
1995: Water Child (L'Enfant d'eau) .... Emile
1996: Urgence (TV Series) .... Dr. Christian Richard
1996: Cosmos .... Morille
1997: Omerta 2, la loi du silence (TV Mini-Series) .... Rick Bonnard
1997: La Conciergerie .... Charles Bass
1998: The Invitation (Short) .... Frédéric
1998: Chance or Coincidence .... Le Thief
1998: The Red Violin .... Handler (Montreal)
1999: Full Blast .... Steph
1999: Opération Tango
2000: The Courage to Love (TV Movie) .... Father Rousselon
2000: Nuremberg (TV Mini-Series) .... Kurt Kauffmann
2000: L'Invention de l'amour .... Antoine
2000: Méchant party .... Sylvain
2001: Un crabe dans la tête .... Alex
2001: Anazapta .... Jacques
2002: Fortier (TV Series) .... André Poupart
2002: Napoléon (TV Mini-Series) .... Duc d'Enghien
2003: Tempo .... Bayliss
2003: Timeline .... Arnaut's Deputy
2004: Ginger Snaps Back: The Beginning .... Claude
2004: Head in the Clouds .... Lucien
2004: Battle of the Brave (Nouvelle-France) .... François le Gardeur
2005: Life with My Father (La Vie avec mon père) .... Patrick
2006: The Beautiful Beast (La Belle bête) .... Lanz
2006: 1st Bite .... Gus
2007: Bluff .... Serge
2007: Muay Thai Chaiya .... Carlos
2008: Modern Love .... François
2008: Dirty money, l'infiltré .... Simon Wenger
2010: Cargo, les hommes perdus. .... Jo
2011: John A.: Birth of a Country (TV Movie) .... George-Étienne Cartier
2012: J'espère que tu vas bien .... Dave
2013: J'espère que tu vas bien 2 .... Dave
2014: Big Muddy .... Donovan Fournier
2015: Aurélie Laflamme: Les pieds sur terre .... Louis Brière
2016: On My Mother's Side (L'Origine des espèces) .... Pascale
2016: The Other Side of November (L'Autre côté de novembre) .... Dr. Michel
2017: Mohawk .... Jean Robichau
2017: Hochelaga, Land of Souls .... Alexis leblanc
2017: All You Can Eat Buddha .... Jean-Pierre Villeneuve / J-P Newtown
2017: Innocent
2017: Another Kind of Wedding .... Roy
2018: Bad Blood (TV Series) .... Alex
2020: The Corruption of Divine Providence ... Louis Séraphin
2020-21: Les Pays d'en haut - Curé Caron (12 episodes)
2021: Confessions of a Hitman (Confessions) - Donald Lemaire
2021: Wars (Guerres)
2022: Arlette - Paul Girouard

Recognition 
 2005 Genie Award for Best Performance by an Actor in a Leading Role - Battle of the Brave (Nouvelle-France) - Nominated
 2005 Jutra Award for Best Actor (Meilleur Acteur) - Nouvelle-France - Nominated
 2002 Genie Award for Best Performance by an Actor in a Leading Role - Soft Shell Man (Un crabe dans la tête) - Nominated
 2002 Jutra Award for Best Actor (Meilleur Acteur) - Un crabe dans la tête - Nominated
 2001 Jutra Award for Best Actor (Meilleur Acteur) - Full Blast - Nominated
 2001 Dallas OUT TAKES for Best Actor - Viens dehors! - Won
 1996 Genie Award for Best Performance by an Actor in a Leading Role - L’Enfant d’eau - Won

References

External links
 

1966 births
Living people
Canadian male film actors
Male actors from Montreal
Best Actor Genie and Canadian Screen Award winners